was a Japanese castle located in Karatsu, Saga Prefecture.

Nagoya Castle was located within Hizen Province on a peninsula near to Iki Island, and served as the base from which Toyotomi Hideyoshi launched his invasions of Korea from 1592 to 1598. None of the original historic structures of Nagoya Castle remain, but the castle's ruined foundations survive in the formerly separate town of Chinzei, now part of the city of Karatsu.

It is said that during the brief time that Hideyoshi stayed at Nagoya Castle, he memorized the shite (lead role) parts for ten Noh plays and performed them, forcing various daimyō to accompany him onstage as the waki (accompanying role), and even performed before the Emperor.

A museum dedicated to the history of Japanese-Korean relations and related subjects is associated with Nagoya Castle and located nearby .

History

Nagoya Castle was located on a hill about 90 meters high on the Higashi-Matsuura Peninsula. During the early Sengoku period (1467–1615), this was a strong-point of the Matsuura clan. According to clan history compiled in centuries later in the Edo period), the Matsuura was a clan allied with the Minamoto, claiming descent from Emperor Saga (r. 809–823), who had a "navy" (or Wokou). 

The castle, built in 1591 by Hideyoshi in preparation for his invasion of Korea, had a five-story tower (Tenshu) on the hill, a magnificent residential palace, and various outlying defenses covering 170,000 square meters. Within a 3 km radius were the camps of about 120 vassals. A town grew up around the military establishments, with a population of over 100,000 people at its height.

After the death of Hideyoshi 18 September 1598, the invasion of Korea came to a halt and the castle is believed to have been abandoned at this time. It is said that construction materials were utilized by Terazawa Hirotaka (1563–1633) to build Karatsu Castle.

See also
List of Special Places of Scenic Beauty, Special Historic Sites and Special Natural Monuments

Literature

References

External links 

Castles in Saga Prefecture